This a list of episodes for the show Savri Maranan.

Series overview

Episodes

Season 1 (2011–12)

Season 2 (2013–14)

Season 3 (2016)

Season 4 (2017–18)

Season 5 (2018-19)

References 

Sabri Maranan